This is a List of notable primary school in South Africa, by Province.

Eastern Cape 
VOORPOS PRIMARY SCHOOL
VOORPOS HIGH SCHOOL
CAMBRIDGE PRIMARY SCHOOL
CAMBRIDGE HIGH SCHOOL

East London 
•  A.W.Barnes Primary School, East London, Eastern Cape
Beaconhurst Primary School, East London
Cambridge Primary School, East London
Clarendon Primary School for Girls, East London
Crewe Primary School, East London
George Randell Primary School, East London
Gonubie Primary School, East London
Hudson Park Primary School, East London 
Laerskool Grens, East London 
Learskool Nahoon, East London
Lilyfontein Primary School, East London
Merrifield Preparatory School, East London
Ncera Intermediate School, East London 
Selborne Primary School, East London
Southernwood Primary School, East London
St. Anne's Primary School, East London
Stirling Primary School, East London 
Voorpos Primary School, East London
West Bank Primary School, East London
Parkside Primary School, East London, Eastern Cape

Rest of province 
 Good Shepherd School, Makhanda
 St. Andrew's Preparatory School, Grahamstown
Wilo Senior Primary School,Mqanduli
Sixhonkxweni Senior Primary School, Mqanduli
Mncwasa S.P.S , Mqanduli
 St Mary's Roman Catholic Primary School, Makhanda

Gauteng

Johannesburg 
 Parkview Senior Primary School
 Opelweg Primary School
 The Ridge School
 St.Micheal Private Primary School
Isekelo Primary School

Pretoria 
 Laerskool en Hoërskool Raslouw
 Regio Centurion Private School
 Waterkloof House Preparatory School
 Laerskool Danie Malan

East Rand 
 St Catherine's School, Germiston, offers both primary and high school

KwaZulu-Natal

Ethekwini 
 Amanzimtoti Primary School, Amanzimtoti 
 Highbury Preparatory School, Hillcrest
 Maris Stella School, Clarence primary school Durban
 Little Flower School, Eshowe

Umdoni
 Amahlashana Senior Primary School, Amandawe Mission
 Amandawe Junior Primary School, Amandawe Mission
 Dududu Junior Primary School, Dududu
 Esbanini Primary School, Mthwalume
 eZembeni Senior Primary School, Dududu
 Scottburgh Primary School, Scottburgh
 St. Annes Primary School, Umzinto
 St. Patrick's Primary School, Umzinto
 uMzintovale Primary School, Umzinto

Zululand
 Nuwe Republiek Primary School, Vryheid
 Lucas Meyer Primere Skool, Vryheid
 Nardini Convent School, Vryheid
 Vryheid Public Primary School, Vryheid
 Michaelis Private School, Vryheid
 Gobeni Primary School, Vryheid

Rest of province 
 Cordwalles Preparatory School, Pietermaritzburg
 Clifton Preparatory School, Nottingham Road,
 Merchiston Preparatory School, Pietermaritzburg
 Treverton Preparatory School and College, Mooi River

Limpopo 
Greenside Primary School, Polokwane
Magaingwana Primary School,Turkey Zone4,Chabelang

Western Cape

Cape Metropole
 Bergvliet Primary School, Bergvliet, Cape Town 
 Aristea Primary School, Kraaifontein 
 Brackenfell Primary School, Brackenfell 
 Durbanville Primary School, Durbanville 
 Gene Louw Primary School, Durbanville 
 Kenridge Primary School, Durbanville 
 Liberté Primary School, Milnerton Ridge, Milnerton 
 Michael Oak Waldorf School, Kenilworth, Cape Town 
 Oakhurst Primary School, Rondebosch, Cape Town 
 Rustenburg School for Girls, Rondebosch, Cape Town 
 South African College Schools (SACS), Newlands, Cape Town
 Table View Primary School, Table View 
 The Grove Primary School, Claremont, Cape Town
Garlandale Primary School, Athlone, Cape Town
Philadelphia Primary School, Philadelphia
Van Riebeeckstrand Primary School, Melkbosstrand
Vissershok Primary School, Vissershok, near Durbanville
Welgemoed Primary School, Bellville
Wynberg Boys' Junior, Wynberg, Cape Town
Wynberg Girls' Junior, Wynberg, Cape Town

See also 
 List of high schools in South Africa

References

External links 
 Department of Education – up-to-date list of registered schools

List
Pri
South Africa